The Man in the Mirror is a 1936 British comedy film, directed by Maurice Elvey and starring Edward Everett Horton, Genevieve Tobin and Ursula Jeans.

Plot
Jeremy Dilke, a withdrawn, mild-mannered man, works in the city. He is preparing an important report on nitrates, but his partner considers him too weak-willed to proceed with the deal. On the Underground train home Veronica, his partner's flirtatious wife, contrives to alight at his stop and persuade him to walk her home. Her plot is foiled by Dilke's wife, Helen, who takes him home in a taxi.

Jeremy argues with Helen and her mother, and both women leave the Dilke home.

Alone in the house, he is surprised when his reflection in the mirror steps out and tells him that he is his alter ego, the kind of man he wishes he was. The man-in-the-mirror then begins to live the more confident, aggressive life that the man had always dreamed of.

He kisses his wife with new passion and flatters his mother-in-law. He also takes command at the office, startling his partner into submission.

The real Dilke no longer sees his reflection in any mirror. While the new Dilke stays at home romancing his wife, the real Dilke can't go home, and is forced to stay in town. The real Dilke checks into a hotel under the name of Thompson, to avoid meeting his alter ego.Veronica spots him and presumes he is open to having an affair under his assumed name.

His partner is eager to close his nitrates deal with two visiting potentates. Vengeful against Jeremy, the partner schemes to squeeze him out of his share of the business. Jeremy sees through the trickery and beats him at his own game. Now successful and happy, and back home, Jeremy and his reflection agree to unite and co-operate.

Cast
 Edward Everett Horton as Jeremy Dilke
 Genevieve Tobin as Helen Dilke
 Ursula Jeans as Veronica Tarkington
 Garry Marsh as Charles Tarkington
 Aubrey Mather as Bogus of Bokhara
 Alastair Sim as the Bogus's Interpreter
 Renee Gadd as Miss Blake
 Viola Compton as Mrs. Massiter
 Stafford Hillard as Dr. Graves
 Felix Aylmer as Earl of Wigan
 Merle Tottenham as Mary
 Syd Crossley as the Porter

Production
The film was produced in England by Julius Hagen. The film's sets were designed by the art director Andrew Mazzei. Grand National Pictures released the film in America.

References

Bibliography
 Low, Rachael. Filmmaking in 1930s Britain. George Allen & Unwin, 1985.
 Sutton, David R. A chorus of raspberries: British film comedy 1929-1939. University of Exeter Press, 2000.
 Wood, Linda. British Films, 1927-1939. British Film Institute, 1986.

External links

1936 films
1930s English-language films
Films directed by Maurice Elvey
1936 comedy films
British comedy films
Films shot at Twickenham Film Studios
Films set in London
British black-and-white films
Films shot at Station Road Studios, Elstree
1930s British films